Batoche may refer to:
Batoche, Saskatchewan, a historic site in Saskatchewan
Batoche (electoral district), an electoral district in Saskatchewan
Batoche (former electoral district), a former electoral district in Saskatchewan
Batoche (N.W.T. electoral district), a former electoral district in the North-West Territories
The Battle of Batoche during the North-East Rebellion/Resistance